A list of films produced in Pakistan in 1979 (see 1979 in film) and in the Urdu language:

1979

See also
1979 in Pakistan

External links
 Search Pakistani film - IMDB.com

1979
Pakistani
Films